2×4 or two by four may refer to:

Music
 , a time signature in music
 2×4 (Guadalcanal Diary album), 1987
 2×4 (Einstürzende Neubauten album), 1984
 2×4 (Malachi Favors & Tatsu Aoki album), 1999
 Two by Four, 1989 album by Marc Johnson
 "2×4", a 1996 song by Metallica from their album Load
 "2×4", a 1995 song by Blind Melon from their album Soup
 "2×4", a 1984 song by The Fall from their album The Wonderful and Frightening World Of...
 "2×4", a 1988 song by The U-Men from their album Step on a Bug

Other uses
 2by4 or 2x4, a 1998 American drama film
 2 inch × 4 inch profile dimensional lumber
 2×4 Roller Derby, a women's roller derby league in Argentina

See also
 4x2 (disambiguation)